The 2004 Oceania Handball Championship was the fourth edition of the Oceania Handball Nations Cup, which took place in Sydney, Australia from 7 to 9 June 2004. Entered nations were Australia, Cook Islands and the New Zealand. Australia won the right to play in the 2005 World Men's Handball Championship in Tunisia.  It was simultaneously hold with the 2004 Pacific Handball Cup.

Table

Results
All times are local (UTC+10).

References

External links
Official website (archived)
Report on Tudor Handball

2004 in handball
International handball competitions hosted by Australia
2004
2004 in Australian sport
International sports competitions hosted at Sydney Olympic Park
June 2004 sports events in Australia